Fritillaria pluriflora is a rare California fritillary known as adobe lily. This wildflower is mainly limited to northern California. It grows in adobe clay soils of the Coast Ranges and low hills in the Central Valley from Tehama and Mendocino Counties south to Solano County.

Description
It has up to ten thick, long, oval-shaped leaves with wavy margins, most of which are clustered at ground level. At the center of the flower is a pinkish to yellowish nectary and bright yellow anthers.

References

pluriflora
Endemic flora of California
Plants described in 1857